Devatha is a 1965 Indian Malayalam film,  directed by K. Padmanabhan Nair and produced by Bharathi Menon. The film stars Prem Nazir, Sathyan, Adoor Bhasi and T. S. Muthaiah in the lead roles. The film had musical score by P. S. Divakar.

Cast

Prem Nazir
Sathyan
Adoor Bhasi
T. S. Muthaiah
Bharathi Menon
Adoor Pankajam
Ambika
Baby Padmini
S. P. Pillai
Sasikala
Sushama

Soundtrack
The music was composed by P. S. Divakar and lyrics were written by Jayadevar and P. Bhaskaran, or are Traditional.

References

External links
 

1965 films
1960s Malayalam-language films